The Mercy is a 2017 British biographical drama film, directed by James Marsh and written by Scott Z. Burns. It is based on the true story of the disastrous attempt by the amateur sailor Donald Crowhurst to complete the Sunday Times Golden Globe Race in 1968 and his subsequent attempts to cover up his failure. The film stars Colin Firth, Rachel Weisz, David Thewlis and Ken Stott. It is one of the last films scored by Icelandic composer Jóhann Jóhannsson.

The film was released in the United Kingdom on 9 February 2018 by StudioCanal.

Plot

In 1968, English businessman Donald Crowhurst is inspired by Sir Francis Chichester to compete in the Sunday Times Golden Globe Race, a single-handed, round-the-world yacht race. Though only an amateur sailor, Crowhurst believes that technology and gumption will enable him to succeed in a custom trimaran, thus ensuring financial security for his wife and young children. As delays and costs mount, his main sponsor, Stanley Best, becomes so nervous that Crowhurst is forced to sign promissory notes pledging his company and home to Best. Sailing away in the Teignmouth Electron, Crowhurst must complete the race or lose everything he holds dear.

Crowhurst arranges sponsorship and a press agent to promote his voyage and he is also supported by his family. During his trip he attempts to give an optimistic version of events to both his family and press agent but inwardly he is feeling under pressure due to his financial situation, the dangers he is encountering and his loneliness. The film cuts between his voyage and scenes at home where his wife Clare is attempting to deal with the situation.

Cast

Production 
On 27 January 2015 it was announced that James Marsh would direct the film, which StudioCanal, Blueprint Pictures, and BBC Films would produce. StudioCanal and BBC would finance the film which had been developed by Christine Langan. StudioCanal would handle the international sales at the European Film Market and would also distribute the film in the UK, France, Germany, Australia and New Zealand. The producers would be Peter Czernin, Graham Broadbent, and Scott Burns, with Nicolas Mauvernay and Jacques Perrin of Galatée Films. On 31 March 2015 Rachel Weisz was reported to be in discussions to play Clare. On 20 May 2015 Weisz was confirmed as Clare, and David Thewlis, Ken Stott and Jonathan Bailey joined the cast. This is the second collaboration of David Thewlis and director James Marsh after The Theory of Everything. Bailey's casting was confirmed by Deadline on 27 May 2015.

Filming 
Principal photography on the film began on location on 20 May 2015 in the United Kingdom. In early June 2015 filming was underway in Teignmouth, Devon, and in mid-June, the production was spotted filming at the Isle of Portland in Dorset. By late July, filming had moved to Malta, where some scenes were planned to be shot in the water tanks at Mediterranean Film Studios in Kalkara. During the filming, Colin Firth was hospitalised with a hip dislocation. The Mercy was also part shot at West London Film Studios. Some scenes were filmed at Chatham Dockyard in Kent, where HMS Gannet was used as the port where the wives of the competition sailors posed for the press. As well as filming at Bewl Water reservoir in Kent, which features as the Teignmouth inlet where Donald Crowhurst (Colin Firth) sails locally alone and with his family.

For the purpose of this film, a full-scale replica of the Teignmouth Electron was constructed by U.K. boatbuilders Heritage Marine, and was used for film sequences shot in England and in Malta. After completion of filming, the replica was purchased by artist Michael Jones McKean, who also owns the original Teignmouth Electron remains beached at Cayman Brac; the replica is currently dry docked in storage on the island of Malta.

Release
In November 2017, Roadside Attractions acquired US distribution rights to the film. It was initially scheduled to be released in the United Kingdom on 27 October 2017, but was eventually moved to 9 February 2018. Despite this, it was screened for awards consideration to members of the British Academy of Film and Television Arts in New York City on 28 November 2017, followed by two screenings in Renfrew Street, Glasgow on 5 December and Fountain Park, Edinburgh on 7 December that year.

Noting that another film based on the same story was also being produced, Studiocanal (the producers of The Mercy) purchased the rights to its competitor Crowhurst, promising to release it soon after the release of the larger-budget production.

Reception
On review aggregator Rotten Tomatoes, the film holds an approval rating of 74% based on 82 reviews, with a weighted average rating of 6.24/10. The website's critical consensus reads, "The Mercy sails on Colin Firth's layered central performance, which adds necessary depth and nuance that the story sometimes lacks." On Metacritic, the film has a weighted average score of 60 out of 100, based on 19 critics, indicating "mixed or average reviews".

See also 
 Crowhurst, a 2017 film on the same subject directed by Simon Rumley
 Deep Water, a 2006 documentary on the subject

References

External links 
 
 
 Desperate Voyage: Donald Crowhurst, The London Sunday Times Golden Globe Race, and the Tragedy of Teignmouth Electron

2017 films
2017 drama films
Films directed by James Marsh
Films shot in England
Films shot in Malta
British biographical drama films
2010s adventure films
2017 biographical drama films
Drama films based on actual events
Seafaring films based on actual events
Sea adventure films
Sailing films
StudioCanal films
BBC Film films
Films produced by Graham Broadbent
Films produced by Scott Z. Burns
Films produced by Jacques Perrin
Films scored by Jóhann Jóhannsson
Films with screenplays by Scott Z. Burns
2010s English-language films
2010s British films